Allison's Pharmacy is a heritage-listed commercial building at 257-259 Windsor Street, Richmond, City of Hawkesbury, New South Wales, Australia. It was added to the New South Wales State Heritage Register on 2 April 1999.

History 

Allison's Pharmacy is a nineteenth-century commercial building. It was acquired by pharmacist and dentist Joseph W. Allison from a Mr. Hawkins in 1890. Allison renovated the property to include facilities for his dental operations. His son succeeded him in the business, which operated out of the building until at least 1940, but had ceased operation some time before J. W. Allison's death in 1945. Advertising signage from the Allison business remains partially visible, though now obscured by the adjoining arcade.

By 1954, an estate agent was operating from the building. The building was vacant in February 2017.

Heritage listing 
Allison's Pharmacy was listed on the New South Wales State Heritage Register on 2 April 1999.

References

Bibliography

Attribution

External links

New South Wales State Heritage Register
Richmond, New South Wales
Commercial buildings in New South Wales
Articles incorporating text from the New South Wales State Heritage Register